Anders Thomsen may refer to:
 Anders Thomsen (footballer)
 Anders Thomsen (speedway rider)